The 2022 Asian Youth & Junior Boxing Championships took place in Amman, Jordan from 2 to 14 March 2022.

Boxers (Men and Women) who were born in 2004 and in 2005 are eligible to participate for these championships. Also, younger boxers born in 2006 and 2007 could compete in the junior part of the championships in Jordan.

Medalists

Youth events

Women

Youth events

Men

Junior events

Women

Junior events

Men

References

Asian Amateur Boxing Championships
Asian Boxing Championships
International sports competitions hosted by Jordan
Asian Boxing Championships
Sports competitions in Amman
Asian Boxing Championships